The 2002 Betty Barclay Cup was a women's tennis tournament played on outdoor clay courts at Am Rothenbaum in Hamburg, Germany and was part of Tier II of the 2002 WTA Tour. It was the 18th and last edition of the tournament and was held from 30 April until 5 May 2002. Second-seeded Kim Clijsters won the singles title and earned $93,000 first-prize money.

Finals

Singles

 Kim Clijsters defeated  Venus Williams 1–6, 6–3, 6–4
 It was Clijsters' 1st title of the year and the 7th of her career.

Doubles

 Martina Hingis /  Barbara Schett defeated  Daniela Hantuchová /  Arantxa Sánchez Vicario 6–1, 6–1

References

External links
 ITF tournament edition details
 Tournament draws

Betty Barclay Cup
WTA Hamburg
2002 in German women's sport
2002 in German tennis